George Reginald Calvert (11 October 1900 – 18 March 1976) was the fourth Bishop of Calgary in the Anglican Church of Canada.

Calvert was educated at the University of Toronto and ordained in 1925. He was the incumbent of Snowflake, Manitoba and then Rector of Holland, Killarney and West Kildonan before becoming Archdeacon of Winnipeg. From 1949 to 1952 he was Rector of Christ Church Cathedral, Victoria, British Columbia and Dean of Columbia before being ordained to the episcopate.  He was a Grand Master of the Grand Lodge, Manitoba (Ancient Free and Accepted Masons). He retired in 1967 and died in 1976.

References

1900 births
University of Toronto alumni
Anglican Church of Canada deans
20th-century Anglican Church of Canada bishops
Anglican bishops of Calgary
1976 deaths
Archdeacons of Winnipeg